Hominy (Osage: Hą́mąðį "night-walker") is a city in Osage County, Oklahoma, United States. The population was 3,565 at the 2010 census, a 38 percent increase over the figure of 2,584 recorded in 2000.

The town was the home of an all-Native American football team in the 1920s. Parts of a docudrama on the Hominy Indians were shot in the area in 2013.

History
The town was incorporated in 1908, though the initial settlement developed in the late 1880s.

From the early 1920s to 1932, Hominy was home to a professional football team composed of Native American players.

The Hominy Indians defeated the New York Giants in 1927, just after the Giants were named champions of the National Football League. The team had a 28-game winning streak at one point during its existence, but was disbanded due to the onset of the Great Depression. A screening of the movie "Playground of the Native Son," based on the events of the team was screened on October 10, 2014, at Circle Cinema, Tulsa's non-profit independent theater.

A medium security prison was constructed in Hominy at the price of $12.8 million and received its first inmates in August 1979. It was originally named the Jess Dunn Correctional Center, in honor of Warden Jess Dunn who had been shot and killed in 1941 by prisoners during an escape attempt. A 1977 joint resolution renamed the facility the Dick Conner Correctional Center. The facility reached its original design capacity of 400 during the spring of 1980.

The prison was severely damaged by a riot that took place on August 29 and 30, 1983. A riot proclamation was issued by then Governor George Nigh on August 30. The inmates torched the buildings adjacent to the kitchen and completely destroyed the library, school, and church area. All of this resulted in the death of an inmate and damages of $3 million. The first special session of the 39th Legislature re-appropriated nearly $2.5 million to fund reconstruction of the facility.

Geography
Hominy is located at  (36.417141, -96.393423).

Demographics

As of the census of 2000, there were 2,584 people, 1,021 households, and 671 families residing in the city. The population density was 1,305.0 people per square mile (503.9/km2). There were 1,208 housing units at an average density of 610.1 per square mile (235.6/km2). The racial makeup of the city was 64.28% White, 1.90% African American, 25.31% Native American, 0.15% Asian, 0.31% from other races, and 8.05% from two or more races. Hispanic or Latino of any race were 3.25% of the population.

There were 1,021 households, out of which 33.5% had children under the age of 18 living with them, 45.7% were married couples living together, 15.2% had a female householder with no husband present, and 34.2% were non-families. 29.6% of all households were made up of individuals, and 15.1% had someone living alone who was 65 years of age or older. The average household size was 2.50 and the average family size was 3.10.

In the city, the population was spread out, with 29.5% under the age of 18, 8.7% from 18 to 24, 24.7% from 25 to 44, 20.9% from 45 to 64, and 16.2% who were 65 years of age or older. The median age was 36 years. For every 100 females, there were 89.2 males. For every 100 females age 18 and over, there were 84.5 males.

The median income for a household in the city was $24,211, and the median income for a family was $27,578. Males had a median income of $25,476 versus $22,073 for females. The per capita income for the city was $13,073. About 19.0% of families and 22.7% of the population were below the poverty line, including 33.8% of those under age 18 and 10.1% of those age 65 or over.

Economy
The town's economy is largely based in oil production and agriculture. Major job providers in the area are the Dick Conner Correctional Center and Osage Casino-Hominy as well as Cleveland Walmart.

Dick Conner Correctional Center
Hominy is home to a medium security facility for men that was opened in 1979. The Dick Conner Correctional Center is named for former Oklahoma State Penitentiary warden and Osage County sheriff R.B. "Dick" Conner.

Transportation
Hominy, northwest of Tulsa, is at the intersection of SH-20 and SH-99.

Hominy Municipal Airport (FAA ID: H92), two miles north of town, features a 3210’ x 60’ paved runway.

Commercial air service is available out of Tulsa International Airport, about 42 miles southeast.<

Trains no longer run through Hominy, but the route has been converted to the Katy Trail.

Government
Hominy has a council-manager form of government.

Sights
The Marland Filling Station, the Hominy School, the Hominy Osage Round House, the Hominy Armory, the Fred and Adeline Drummond House, and the Bank of Hominy are all on the National Register of Historic Places listings in Osage County, Oklahoma.

The MKT Train Depot built around 1910, being the former passenger station for the Missouri-Kansas-Texas Railroad, is now a museum with a number of working miniature train sets on display as well as having a full-size MKT caboose.

Hominy sports a number of open-air murals from local artist Cha’ Tullis, as well as his metal sculpture “New Territory” atop a hill west of downtown.

The 165-acres Hominy Municipal Lake has a boat ramps, a fishing dock, and other amenities.

Sports and other activities
The Hominy Bucks, whose colors are purple and white and whose mascot is a Buck (a Native American warrior - NOT a deer), have produced several boys and girls championship teams as well as individual athletes and performers who have had outstanding careers over the years.
 
Hominy's high school football team is recognized as one of the top high school programs in the state of Oklahoma. The Bucks currently hold five state football championship titles which were won in 1973, 1982, 1983, 2001 and 2016. The team narrowly lost state championship games in 1959, 1968 and 1972. The team has won 25 district championships and have only missed the state playoffs twice since 1977. The football team competes in the Oklahoma Secondary Schools Activity Association (OSSAA), within the class A division. 
The Arkansas River Rivalry is played every year between Hominy and Cleveland High Schools and is one of the oldest rivalries in the state, dating back to 1922. The Battle of the Osage is the rivalry game between Hominy and Pawhuska and has also been played nearly annually since 1922.

Hominy's football teams have produced several notable athletes in its history of athletics. Zaven Collins who played Quarterback for Hominy High School, led the team to a State Championship in 2016. Collins later received a scholarship to attend Tulsa University, where he was awarded the Bronko Nagurski Trophy, the Lombardi Award, and the Chuck Bednarik Award as the nations best defensive player. Collins was later selected by the Arizona Cardinals in the first round (16th overall) of the 2021 NFL Draft.  Reuben Deroin played for Oklahoma State University in the 1950s. Kenny Rader was Hominy's first All-State football player as well as earning Prep All-American honors in 1960. Rader went on to play football for Tulsa University. Running back Harry Roy Red Eagle, who signed with Kansas University, was selected to the Oklahoma All-State football team and the high school Prep All-American Team in 1961. Unlike today, in the early 60's there was only one high school All-American team in the United States. Red Eagle is also the only player from Hominy High School to have his jersey number (#30) retired in 1961; running back Bob Hudson was another stellar player whose family produced a number of great athletes that have played for the Bucks. Hudson played for the Green Bay Packers in 1972 and the Oakland Raiders 1973-1974; defensive back Jesse Hudson played for the New York Giants in 1977; former University of Oklahoma defensive back Scott Garl; defensive back Mike Hudson played collegiately for the Oklahoma State Cowboys and for the San Diego Chargers in 1987. Hominy's former head football coach Scott Harmon played defensive back at Oklahoma State University as well.

Hominy's Boys Basketball Teams have also had success on the court and have won two state championship titles in 1945 and 1982. The 1982 state championship team was coached by Don Sloan. Buck basketball players Amos Shadlow Jr. and Steven Lookout played collegiality for the University of Tulsa's Golden Hurricane squads.  The Lady Bucks have also seen many of its former players go on to play at the collegiate level, including Chrissie Frazier Fairweather (Oklahoma State University).

Along with producing numerous individual state champions the Hominy Boys Track and Field teams have produced four state team titles which were won in 1976, 1981, 1983 and 2000.

The athletic programs have seen many Bucks and Lady Bucks garner All-State recognition in football, basketball, and track.

Hominy's Baseball Teams have been competitive over the years producing players like Marques Davis who played at Oklahoma State University in 1997.

The Hominy High School Band was the Class 1A champion and came in 9th overall at 1A - 3A OBA in 2000.

The high school cheerleading squad has won FIVE state championships, in 1990, 1992, 1993, 2007 and 2011.

Notable people

 Mildred Andrews Boggess (1915-1987), Pipe organ Professor at the University of Oklahoma
 Zaven Collins (b. 1999), Linebacker for the Arizona Cardinals.
 Mavis Doering (1929–2007), award-winning Cherokee basketweaver and educator
 Gentner Drummond, Lawyer, businessman and aspiring politician
 Floyd Gass (1927-2006), football coach at Oklahoma State University
 Bob Hudson (b. 1948), NFL player
 Kenneth M. Taylor (1919–2006), brigadier general during World War II

Notes

References

External links
 Encyclopedia of Oklahoma History and Culture - Hominy

 
Cities in Oklahoma
Cities in Osage County, Oklahoma